Latiao is a popular Chinese snack. The main raw materials are wheat flour and chili. After adding water, salt, sugar, natural pigment and other surface, the flour is extruded under high temperature, then mixed with chili and other seasonings including preservatives whose component matches Chinese food additive standard GB2760.

Processed food products entail some risks, particularly in smaller kitchens. Specific risks are the quality of oil, food additives such as carmine and sanitation.

History 
Latiao (Spicy strip), originated in Pingjiang County, Hunan. It was at first called mianjin. Later, Pingjiang people called it  Latiao is made from flour that is cooked and seasoned, and is not fried and spicy. Pingjiang has a history of making dried sauce, spicy sauce and spicy bean curd, which are important parts of the Pingjiang industry.

In 1998, a major flood disaster occurred in Hunan, which led to a serious loss of agricultural products. Soybean, the main raw material for sauce industry, experienced a large decline in production. This directly caused a devastating blow to the dried sauce industry. In order to support the family, farmers urgently needed a new approach. Qiu Pingjiang, Li Mengneng, and Zhong Qingyuan used wheat flour instead of soy flour. Using single-screw extrusion machinery, adding chili, pepper, cumin, sugar, salt, vegetable oil and other condiments, they invented Latiao.

In 1990 Latiao debuted and quickly became popular across China. At the beginning, it was sold in small shops, before expanding to supermarkets.

In February 2016, the British TV broadcaster BBC aired a three-part documentary on Chinese New Year celebrations in which the two presenters were seen roaming a typical Chinese snack street, Latiao in hand. Min Quanlu, production manager of WL-Foods, a major latiao maker, said that the company packaged the snack by hand until 2011, when demand exploded. "We make 600 million yuan's worth of latiao each year and employ about 2,000 workers," Min said. "About 20 percent of our products are sold in the domestic market, and the rest goes overseas."

Exposure 
China Central Television in its 3.15 investigation revealed dust mixed with grease oozing from machines at the production workshop of Xiachedan Latiao at Gaochang Village in Kaifeng, Henan. More than 10 additives were seen lying on the ground.

At Oufei Latiao factory in Tantougao Village, the machines were again found to be greasy.
At Aiqingwangzi factory at Wangu Village in Yueyang, Hunan, a worker could be seen taking gluten slices from the ground and then putting them into machines.
At Weiquan Food Co in Futan Village, Latiao was set on dirty rags, while workers did not wear masks or gloves. They packaged latiao with their hands.

The Hubei Food and Drug Administration declared that according to the draft national standard of food additives for food safety, sorbic acid and dehydroacetic acid should not be used in flavored flour products, therefore Latiao is not fit for human consumption. On May 14, 2019, the National Health Commission of the People's Republic of China released the draft National Standard of Food Additives for food safety. The event exposed regulatory conflicts between local and national standards for food additives and qualifies Latiao products in Henan Province, but not in other places.

Popular element

Social networks reveal catchwords about Latiao, such as “taste one Latiao and calm down”, “I have a Latiao who would like to be my friend”, “bought a hundred packs of Latiao, I am just richer and wayward”.

References

External link 
 Weilong Food Co. - a major latiao maker
 Yufeng Food Co. - a major latiao maker

Snack foods
Chinese cuisine
Wheat dishes